Absolute Polysics is the ninth full-length studio album from Japanese new wave act Polysics, and the last to feature vocalist and keyboardist Kayo before her departure in 2010. The album was released in September 2009 in Japan and in January 2010 in the U.S.

The album includes the singles "Young OH! OH!" and "Shout Aloud!".

Track listing

Personnel

 Shigekazu Aida – producer
 Hidero Asakawa – photography
 Koichi Endo – executive producer
 Hiroyuki Hayashi – synthesizer, guitar, programming, vocals, vocoder, whistle
 Yuji Katsui – electric violin
 Noriyuki Kikuchi – A&R
 Kotaro Kojima – mastering
 Michihiko Nakayama – executive producer
 Satomi Nanseki – engineer, mixing
 Alex Newport – mixing
 Michifumi Onodera – engineer, mixing
 Polysics – producer
 Kaichiro Shirai – mastering
 Yoshinori "Tsucchie" Tsuchida – drum technician
 Masashi Yano – drums, vocals

References

External links
 Polysics official website
 Polysics official MySpace

2009 albums
Polysics albums